Bonita Unified School District serves the communities of San Dimas and La Verne, and part of Glendora,  in Los Angeles County. 

The Bonita Unified School District has over 10,000 students in 14 schools.  The district's headquarters are in San Dimas. The Board of Education members are elected at-large to a four-year term. The elections are held on a Tuesday after the first Monday in November of even-numbered years, starting with the 2018 election.

Schools

Elementary schools (K-5)
 Allen Avenue Elementary School
 Arma J. Shull Elementary School
 Fred Ekstrand Elementary School
 Gladstone Elementary School
 Grace Miller Elementary School
 J. Marion Roynon Elementary School
 La Verne Heights Elementary School
 Oak Mesa Elementary School

Middle schools (6-8)
 Lone Hill Middle School
 Ramona Middle School

High school (9-12)
 Bonita High School
 San Dimas High School
 Chaparral High School (continuation high school)

Alternative school (K-12)
 Vista School

External links 
 Official Bonita Unified School District website
 GreatSchools.net: Bonita Unified School District

School districts in Los Angeles County, California
Glendora, California
La Verne, California
San Dimas, California